Darya Gali is a village and union council of Murree Tehsil in the Murree District of Punjab, Pakistan. It is located in the north of the tehsil and is bounded to the north by Khyber-Pakhtunkhwa, to the south by Ghora Gali and Murree, and to the west by Rawat.

According to the 1998 census of Pakistan it had a population of 11,414. most popular and known persons from uc daryagali subedar ashraf Abbasi raja shafqat abbasi Muhammed ejaz abbasi raja usman abbasi haji abdul wahid asmar ahmad abbasi haji gulzar abbasi sardar masood abbasi. Haji zahrab  Shakil Abbasi Mohammad Anis Abbasi Harris ali Abbasi

References

Populated places in Murree District
Galyat of Pakistan